The 1989 Italy rugby union tour of Argentina was a series of matches played in June 1989 in Argentina by the Italy national rugby union team.

The tour went well for Italy, following several prior years of poor results. Italy won the first four matches and lost only against Cordoba (led by Diego Dominguez, the future fly half of Italy) and the "Pumas".

Results
Scores and results list Italy's points tally first.

Bibliography
  Valerio Vecchiarelli, Francesco Volpe, 2000, Italia in meta, GS editore, 2000.

  Memorias de la UAR 1989

Italy
tour
Italy national rugby union team tours
tour
Rugby union tours of Argentina